Rana Shamim Ahmed Khan (born 6 July 1942) is a Pakistani politician who has been a member of the National Assembly of Pakistan, since August 2018. Previously he was member of the National Assembly from June 2013 to May 2018 and a member of the Provincial Assembly of the Punjab from 1985 to 1996.
He is current chairman of Standing Committee for Kashmir affairs and Gilgit Baltistan.

Early life
He was born on 6 July 1942.

Political career

He was elected to the Provincial Assembly of the Punjab from Constituency PP-145 (Sialkot) in 1985 Pakistani general election.

He was re-elected to the Provincial Assembly of the Punjab as a candidate for Islami Jamhoori Ittehad (IJI) for Constituency PP-105 (Sialkot) in 1988 Pakistani general election. He received 31,001 votes and defeated Khalid Muhammad Khaliq, a candidate of PPP.

He was re-elected to the Provincial Assembly of the Punjab as a candidate for IJI for Constituency PP-105 (Sialkot) in 1990 Pakistani general election. He received 39,786 votes and defeated Ijaz Hussain, a candidate of Pakistan Democratic Alliance (PDA).

He was re-elected to the Provincial Assembly of the Punjab as a candidate for Pakistan Peoples Party (PPP) for Constituency PP-105 (Sialkot) in 1993 Pakistani general election. He received 33,829 votes and defeated Malik Awais Ahmad Bhatti, a candidate of Pakistan Muslim League (N) (PML-N).

Shamim was re-elected to the Provincial Assembly of the Punjab  as a candidate for PML-N for Constituency PP-124 (Sialkot-IV) in 2008 Pakistani general election. He received 24,994 votes and defeated Zulfiqar Ali Ghuman, a candidate of Pakistan Muslim League (Q) (PML-Q).

He was re-elected to the Provincial Assembly of the Punjab as a candidate for PML-N for PP-124 (Sialkot-IV) in by-polls held in June 2008. He received 24,994 votes.

He was elected to the National Assembly of Pakistan as a candidate for PML-N for Constituency NA-112 (Sialkot-III) in 2013 Pakistani general election. He received 129,571 votes and defeated Salman Saif Cheema, a candidate of Pakistan Tehreek-e-Insaf (PTI).

He was re-elected to the National Assembly as a candidate of PML-N from Constituency NA-76 (Sialkot-V) in 2018 Pakistani general election. He received 133,664 votes and defeated Mohammad Aslam Ghuman, a candidate of PTI.

References

Living people
Pakistan Muslim League (N) politicians
Punjabi people
Pakistani MNAs 2013–2018
Politicians from Sialkot
1942 births
Punjab MPAs 2008–2013
Punjab MPAs 1985–1988
Punjab MPAs 1988–1990
Punjab MPAs 1990–1993
Punjab MPAs 1993–1996
Pakistani MNAs 2018–2023